Kantküla may refer to several places in Estonia:
Kantküla, Harju County, village in Kõue Parish, Harju County
Kantküla, Jõgeva County, village in Torma Parish, Jõgeva County
Kantküla, Lääne-Viru County, village in Rägavere Parish, Lääne-Viru County
Kantküla, former village in Albu Parish, Järva County

See also
Kandiküla, village in Tähtvere Parish, Tartu County